Schmeichel is the name of several people:

 Dean Schmeichel, Canadian wrestler
 Peter Bolesław Schmeichel (born 1963), Danish footballer, father of Kasper Schmeichel
 Kasper Peter Schmeichel (born 1986, Copenhagen), Danish footballer, son of Peter Schmeichel
 Schmeichel, Coronation Street, a fictional character

German words and phrases
German-language surnames